Marvania is a genus of green algae in the family Chlorellaceae.

The genus name of Marvania is in honour of Petr Marvan (b.1929), who was a (b.1929) Czech / Czechoslovakian botanist (Algology, Mycology and Lichenology), Hydrobiologist who worked at the Water Research Institute.

The genus was circumscribed by František Hindák in Arch. Hydrobiol. Suppl. vol.49 on page 268 in 1976.

References

External links

Trebouxiophyceae genera
Chlorellaceae